XUpdate is a lightweight XML query language for modifying XML data. After some early enthusiastic development by a small team, the development of the standard faltered around the end of 2000 and it has never found widespread adoption. However, it has found a niche market of users not content to wait for the XQuery Update Facility extension of the W3C standard, XQuery.

External links 

 Last Working Draft, September 14, 2000
 XQuery Update facility
 XUpdate update O'Reilly article from 2005 summarising XUpdate development
 eXist supports XUpdate via its XML-RPC API - XUpdate, XML:DB API - XUpdate and its REST API - XUpdate
 Apache XIndice supports XUpdate
 Sedna supports XUpdate via its XML:DB API

XML-based standards